Trichopeza albocincta is a European species of Empididae.

References

Asilomorph flies of Europe
Empididae
Insects described in 1846